Jean Margain (24 February 1931 - 15 February 2012) was a French Hebraist. He is known by his Semitic and Samaritan studies.

Life

Education 
Margain got his Doctor of Arts in 1988 with his thesis Les particules dans le Targum samaritain de Genèse-Exode: jalons pour une histoire de l'araméen samaritain at Université Paris III.

Academic work 
He was Director of research at the French National Centre for Scientific Research (CNRS) and president of the Sessions de langues bibliques (in 1988). He also was Director of studies at École Pratique des Hautes Études (EPHE), and Chair of Biblical and Targoumic Philology, from 1991 to 1996.

Selected works 
 
 Le livre de Daniel: commentaire philologique du texte araméen. Beauchesne, Paris 1994.

References

Literature 
 

2012 deaths
Academic staff of the École pratique des hautes études
Hebraists
Research directors of the French National Centre for Scientific Research
1931 births